Exu is a city in the state of Pernambuco, Brazil. The population in 2007, according with IBGE was 31,766 and the area is 1337 km².
Exu is the birthplace of the famous Luiz Gonzaga (1912/1989) which was a very prominent Brazilian folk singer, songwriter, musician and poet. He is considered to be responsible for the promotion of northeastern music throughout the rest of the country. He is also known as the "king of baião" and "Gonzagão".

Geography

 State – Pernambuco
 Region – Sertão Pernambucano
 Boundaries – Ceará state (N); Granito (S); Bodocó (W); Moreilândia (E)
 Area – 1474 km²
 Elevation – 523 m
 Hydrography – Brigida River
 Vegetation – Caatinga and Subperenifólia forest.
 Climate – transition between tropical hot and semi arid- hot and dry
 Annual average temperature – 24.8 c
 Distance to Recife – 607 km

Economy

The main economic activities in Exu are based in agribusiness, especially creation of cattle, pigs, goats; and plantations of corn, beans, manioc, coffee and tobacco .

Economic Indicators

Economy by Sector
2006

Health Indicators

References

Municipalities in Pernambuco